The Shaximiao Formation is a Middle to Late Jurassic aged geological formation in Sichuan, China, most notable for the wealth of dinosaurs fossils that have been excavated from its strata. The Shaximiao Formation is exposed in and around the small township of Dashanpu, situated seven kilometres north-east from Sichuan's third largest city, Zigong, in the Da'an District.

Geology 
The Shaximiao Formation includes two distinct subunits: The upper and lower Shaximiao Formations, although they are commonly referred to as one, simply being called the "Shaximiao Formation".  The upper Shaximiao Formation is also known as the Shangshaximiao Formation, and the lower Shaximiao Formation is also known as the Xiashaximiao Formation, which are direct transliterations of the Chinese names. Both subunits primarily consist of purple-red mudstones, with variable sand inclusion. and siltstones with interbedded sandstones.

Dinosaur finds 
 
The Shaximiao Formation has produced mainly sauropods, but has also held numerous other dinosaur types, such as theropods and stegosaurians amongst others. In total, over 8,000 pieces of bone have been unearthed from the area – amounting to nearly 40 tonnes. The site was unknown until the early 1970s, when a Chinese gas company unearthed Gasosaurus in 1972. It would be the first of the many dinosaurs to be uncovered from the area. Most specimens found are held at the Zigong Dinosaur Museum which has been placed on the area during the mid-1980s.

Despite being a frequented "dinosaur-quarry" at present, the Shaximiao Formation was once a lush forest, evidence of which has been found alongside dinosaur remains in the form of fossilised wood. Paleontologists speculate that the area also had a lake that was fed by a large river. Dinosaur remains would have been swept toward the lake over millions of years, thus accounting for the hundreds of specimens found. Based on biostratigraphy, the Lower Shaximiao Formation has been usually seen to date to 168 to 161 million years old, between the Bathonian to Callovian stages of the Mid Jurassic, while the Upper Shaximiao was thought to be Oxfordian in age. A paper by Wang et al. (2018), (recalibrated dates reported in Moore et al. (2020)), reported a zircon U-Pb age of 160.4 ± 0.4 mya for the lower part of the Shaximiao Formation, suggesting that the Shaximiao Formation is younger than previously thought. Contradicting this, U-Pb dates from a tuff bed supports traditional Middle Jurassic age for the lower part of the formation, with an average age of around 166.0 ± 1.5 Ma. The top of the Shaximiao Formation has been believed to be the end of the Tithonian age.

Dong Zhiming's research 
The paleontologist who has made the largest contribution to the formation and its excavation is Dong Zhiming. He first examined the formation in 1975, after bone fragments were found embedded in rock from the area. The site was being demolished to make way for both a natural gas field facility and a vehicle park when Dong first saw the area. Amongst the extensive clearings, Dong found numerous bone fragments which were exposed.

However, the specimens were being damaged due to bulldozers in the area and there would be little chance of closing the area as the state had invested millions of yuan in the site already. It was not until 1985 that the government finally agreed to close the construction on the site, and by then Dong and his team had already excavated over 100 dinosaurs from the area, including several rare sauropod skulls. A dinosaur found in the Shaximiao Formation, Dashanpusaurus dongi, was named in tribute of both Dashanpu and Dong Zhiming.

Paleobiota 
In addition to dinosaur finds, many other prehistoric finds have been uncovered from the Shaximiao Formation. Amongst these finds are fishes, amphibians, turtles, marine reptiles such as crocodiles and also pterosaurs. Bienotheroides, a Tritylodont Synapsid has been found there, as well as Sinobrachyops, a Labyrinthodont.

Sauropterygians

Crocodyliformes

Pterosaurs

Dinosaurs

Ornithischians

Sauropods

Theropods

Turtles

Therapsids

See also 
 List of dinosaur-bearing rock formations

References

External links 
 Dong Zhiming account of Shaximiao Formation

Geologic formations of China
Jurassic System of Asia
Jurassic China
Tithonian Stage
Kimmeridgian Stage
Oxfordian Stage
Sandstone formations
Mudstone formations
Fluvial deposits
Ichnofossiliferous formations
Fossiliferous stratigraphic units of Asia
Paleontology in Sichuan